Mina is a given name with a variety of origins, used as a feminine name in some cultures and a masculine name in others.

Egypt 
Mina, Coptic Μήνης is a male given name for Egyptian Coptic Christians.

Mina in the Coptic language (derived from ancient Egyptian language) means: a person who is steadfast, committed, unrelenting or determined.

 Mina (fl. c. 3100 BC), a.k.a. Menes, legendary Egyptian ruler and the first pharaoh of Egypt.
 St. Mina (Saint Menas; fl. 3rd century AD), Coptic religious leader (martyr)
 Mina, son of Apacyrus (fl. 749 AD), one of the leaders of the Bashmurian revolts

Arabic 
Mina, Minah, Meena (Arabic: مِينَا mīnā) is an Arabic female given name transformed from the female given name "Amina", but perhaps the Arabic "Mina" is the Persian "Mina" which bears the meaning "stained (tinted) glass mirror", artistic paint (also generic name for enamel or varnish) for porcelain and metal. 

See Mina (disambiguation)

Chinese 
Mina is a Chinese female given name. It may be written as 米娜, 蜜娜 and 密娜. Na (娜) is a commonly used character in Chinese female names.

 Mina Shum (born 1966) is an independent Canadian filmmaker

Cambodian 
Mina is a unisex name which means the month of March in the Cambodian language, Khmer. It is written មីនា.

India 
Meena is an Indian female given name. The name is derived from Hindi मैना maina ultimately from Sanskrit मदन madana-s, which means "joyful".

Japanese
Mina is a Japanese feminine given name.

Mina Asami (born 1958), Japanese actress
Mina Fukui (born 1984), Japanese actress
Mina Harigae (born 1989), American golfer
Mina Kasai (born 1984), Japanese voice actress
Mina Matsushima (born 1991), Japanese swimmer
Mina Myoi (born 1997), Japanese singer and member of South Korean girl group Twice
Mina Ōba (born 1992), Japanese singer and actress
, Japanese women's footballer
, Japanese judoka

Korean

Mina, Meena, and Minah are various Roman alphabet spellings of two homophonous Korean feminine given names with different hangul spellings. The meaning differs based on the hanja used to write each syllable of the name.

For the name Min-a (민아), there are 27 hanja with the reading "min" and 20 hanja with the reading "a" on the South Korean government's official list of hanja which may be used in given names.

Bang Min-ah (born 1993), South Korean singer, member of Girl's Day
Shim Mina (born 1972), South Korean singer
Jung Mina (born 1979), South Korean gayageum singer-songwriter
Shin Min-a (born 1984), South Korean actress
Kwon Mina (born 1993), South Korean singer, member of AOA
Jung Min-ah (born 1994), South Korean actress
Kang Min-ah (born 1997), South Korean actress
Justine Mina Ok (fl. 2000s), Korean American songwriter

For the name Mi-na (미나), there are 31 hanja with the reading "mi" and 16 hanja with the reading "na" on the South Korean government's official list of hanja which may be used in given names.

Mina Cho (born 1960), South Korean writer
Son Mi-na (born 1964), South Korean handball player
Meena Lee (born 1981), South Korean golfer
Kang Mi-na (born 1999), South Korean singer, member of I.O.I and Gugudan

Persian
Mina ( mīnā) is a female given name in Iran, meaning "azure", "azure sky", "blue (decanter) or glass", "glass bead", or "enamel". Mina is also another name of lapis lazuli (Persian: لاجورد lājward, colloquially "lāzward")

Mina is also the name for the birds mockingbird or myna ('morgh-e-mina [Persian: مرغِ مينا murgh-i mīnā, literal meaning "Mina bird"]), which easily repeats many sounds like a human voice and the name of the flower marguerite (marguerite daisy) ("gol-e-mina" [Persian: گلِ مينا gul-i mīnā, literal meaning "Mina flower"]). 

The Turkish spelling of the name is Mine.

 Mina Assadi (born 1943), Iranian poet
 Mina Nouri (born 1951), Iranian painter
 Mina Ahadi (born 1956), Iranian politician
 Mina Hadjian (born 1975), Iranian-born Norwegian television host
 Mine Ercan (born 1978), Turkish women's wheelchair basketball player

PashtoMina''' or Meena means "love" in Pashto, an Eastern Iranian language spoken in Afghanistan and the Pashtun Diaspora of Pakistan, which is the feminine noun for the word "lover" – the masculine form is "māyan میين". Although no source of it as used in a name except for the Persian "Mina". See Meena (disambiguation)

Meena Keshwar Kamal (1956–1987), Afghan women's rights activist

Other
Mina can be a short form of the feminine names Wilhelmina, Hermina or Assimina (in the case of Greek names).

 Mina Bruere (died 1937), American banker
Mina Loy (1882–1966), English poet
 Mina Karadžić, Serbian 19th century poet
 Mina (Italian singer) (born 1940), Italian singer
 Mina Kimes (born 1985), American journalist 
 Mina Kostić (born 1969), Serbian folk singer
 Mina Napartuk (1913–2001), Canadian Inuit artist 
 Mina Minovici (1858–1933), Romanian forensic scientist
 Mina Orfanou (born 1982), Greek actress
 Mina Papatheodorou-Valyraki, Greek painter
 Mina Popović (born 1994), Serbian volleyball player
 Mina Shum, Canadian filmmaker

Fictional
 Meenah Peixes in the webcomic Homestuck Mina (Dragonlance), herald of the One God in Dragonlance Mina, in the animated series Jelly Jamm Mina in Karakai Jozu no Takagi-san Mina, the main character in Mina and the Count
 Mina, artist and Trial Captain of Poni Island in Pokémon Sun & Moon and Pokémon Ultra Sun & Ultra MoonMina Aino, Sailor Venus in the Sailor Moon anime and manga series
 Mina Ashido in My Hero Academia anime and manga series
 Mina Beff in Todd Kauffman's Grojband Mina Carolina in the anime and manga series Attack on Titan Mina Harker (née Murray), the protagonist and heroine in Bram Stoker's novel Dracula, also appearing in other media
 Mina Kim in the game Mystic Messenger Mina Loveberry, a magical warrior in Star vs. the Forces of Evil Mina Majikina in the video game Samurai Shodown Mina McKee in David Almond's children's book Skellig and its prequel My Name is Mina Mina Mongoose, female mongoose in the comic series Sonic the Hedgehog Mina Monroe in the animated series Bunnicula
 Mina Nakanotani in anime and manga Air Master Mina Rai in the video game Yandere Simulator Mina Tepeş in the Japanese manga series Dance in the Vampire Bund 
 Mina Tsukishiro in the Japanese anime series Getsumento Heiki Mina Seong Mi-na in the Soul series of fighting video games
 Yoo Mi-na in 2012 South Korean television series Time Slip Dr. Jin''

See also
 Minna (name)
 Wilhelmina (disambiguation)
 Mena (given name)
 Minnie (disambiguation)

References

English feminine given names
Iranian feminine given names
Japanese feminine given names
Korean feminine given names
Pakistani feminine given names
Serbian feminine given names